Wanda McKay (born Dorothy Quackenbush; June 22, 1915 – April 11, 1996) was an American actress and model.

Early years
McKay was born as Dorothy Quackenbush in Portland, Oregon, but her family later moved to Fort Worth in Texas. After moving to New York she became a model and her image was used to promote Chesterfield cigarettes.

In 1938, McKay represented Trans World Airlines, for which she worked as a hostess, in a beauty competition at the Birmingham Air Show. She won, being voted "Miss American Aviation".

Career 
By 1939 McKay had moved into films after being given a contract by Paramount Pictures. Initially she made small uncredited appearances before going on to starring roles as a leading lady in many B Movies during the 1940s, working in particular at studios such as PRC and Monogram Pictures. Film worked dried up for her in the 1950s, and she appeared on television and in a minor role in The Merry Widow (1952). Her last film appearance was a small uncredited part in Ten Thousand Bedrooms (1957).

Personal life 
In 1977 she married Hoagy Carmichael, a marriage that lasted until his death in 1981.

Death 
On April 11, 1996, McKay died of cancer in Los Angeles. She was 80.

Partial filmography

 $1000 a Touchdown (1939) - Babe (uncredited)
 Our Neighbors – The Carters (1939) - Usherette (uncredited)
 All Women Have Secrets (1939) - Jessie
 The Farmer's Daughter (1940) - Cashier (uncredited)
 Those Were the Days! (1940) - Minor Role (uncredited)
 The Way of All Flesh (1940) - Cigarette Girl (uncredited)
 The Great McGinty (1940) - Bit Role (uncredited)
 Mystery Sea Raider (1940) - Lois (uncredited)
 The Quarterback (1940) - Blonde (uncredited)
 Dancing on a Dime (1940) - Lulu
 Life with Henry (1940) - Girl on Theatre Stage (uncredited)
 A Night at Earl Carroll's (1940) - Girl in Steve's Party (uncredited)
 Love Thy Neighbor (1940) - Showgirl (uncredited)
 Virginia (1941) - Girl (uncredited)
 The Mad Doctor (1941) - Girl at Charity Bazaar (uncredited)
 You're the One (1941) - Girl
 The Lady Eve (1941) - Daughter on Ship (uncredited)
 Las Vegas Nights (1941) - Cigarette Girl (uncredited)
 The Pioneers (1941) - Suzanna Ames
 Twilight on the Trail (1941) - Lucy Brent
 New York Town (1941) - Minor Role (uncredited)
 The Royal Mounted Patrol (1941) - Betty Duvalle
 Rolling Down the Great Divide (1942) - Rita
 The Lone Rider in Texas Justice (1942) - Kate Stewart
 One Thrilling Night (1942) - Millie Jason
 Law and Order (1942) - Linda Fremont
 Bowery at Midnight (1942) - Judy Malvern
 Corregidor (1943) - Nurse Jane 'Hey-Dutch' Van Dornen
 The Black Raven (1943) - Lee Winfield
 Let's Face It (1943) - Chorus Girl (uncredited)
 Danger! Women at Work (1943) - Doris Bendix
 Deerslayer (1943) - Hetty Hutter
 Smart Guy (1943) - Jean Wickers
 What a Man! (1944) - Joan Rankin
 Voodoo Man (1944) - Betty
 The Monster Maker (1944) - Patricia
 Raiders of Ghost City (1944, Serial) - Cathy Haines
 Leave It to the Irish (1944) - Nora O'Brien
 Belle of the Yukon (1944) - Cherie Atterbury
 There Goes Kelly (1945) - Anne Mason
 Hollywood and Vine (1945) - Martha Manning
 Sensation Hunters (1945) - Helen
 Kilroy Was Here (1947) - Connie Harcourt
 Jiggs and Maggie in Society (1947) - Millicent Perker
 Stage Struck (1948) - Helen Howard
 Jinx Money (1948) - Virginia
 Jungle Goddess (1948) - Greta Vanderhorn
 The Golden Eye (1948) - Evelyn Manning
 The Story of Life (1948)
 Because of Eve (1948) - Sally Stephens
 A Woman of Distinction (1950) - Merle - Shop Girl (uncredited)
 Roaring City (1951) - Sylvia Rand
 The Merry Widow (1952) - Girl at Maxim's (uncredited)
 Ten Thousand Bedrooms (1957) - New York Operator (uncredited) (final film role)

Notes

References

Bibliography
 Raw, Laurance. Character Actors in Horror and Science Fiction Films, 1930–1960. McFarland, 2012.

External links

1915 births
1996 deaths
Female models from Oregon
American film actresses
Actresses from Portland, Oregon
20th-century American actresses